Bullina callizona is a species of sea snail, a marine gastropod mollusc in the family Aplustridae, one of the families of bubble snails. These snails occur along the coastlines of Japan and the Philippines.

References

Aplustridae
Gastropods described in 1961
Marine molluscs of Asia
Gastropods of Asia
Molluscs of the Pacific Ocean